Camilla Semino Favro (born 16 August 1986) is an Italian actress.

Early life and career 
She was born in 1986 in Torre del Greco but grew up in Genoa. After obtaining the classical high school diploma at the Liceo Andrea D'Oria she moved to Milan to attend the acting school of the Piccolo Teatro directed by Luca Ronconi. In 2008 she got her diploma.

After her debut in the theater at the age of 22, she ventured on the stages of Rome, Turin and Milan in numerous representations taken from the works of Carlo Goldoni, Federico García Lorca, William Shakespeare, Henrik Ibsen, Mark Ravenhill, Simon Stephens and Penelope Skinner. She works under the direction of Elio De Capitani, Ferdinando Bruni, Gabriele Lavia, Serena Sinigaglia, Mimmo Sorrentino, Massimo De Francovich, Emiliano Bronzino.

In 2009 she made her debut on Rai 1 interpreting the fiction Fuoriclasse directed by Riccardo Donna alongside Luciana Littizzetto and Neri Marcorè. She continues her experience on the small screen working on the set of Benvenuti a tavola - Nord vs Sud, with Giorgio Tirabassi and Fabrizio Bentivoglio, and Ris Roma 3, both directed by Francesco Miccichè.

In 2012 she starred alongside Vittoria Puccini in a miniseries Altri tempi as Edda, a girl from a brothel in the 1950s. The video clip of En and Xanax dates back to 2013, a single by the singer-songwriter Samuele Bersani. In the video, Camilla stars alongside actor Alessandro Sperduti.

Later she shoots other TV series such as Le mani dentro la città and Una grande famiglia. In 2013 she is again on the set of L'assalto next to Diego Abatantuono. In 2015 she joined the cast of Thou Shalt Not Kill aired on Rai 3, a TV series much appreciated by critics. Her film debut came in 2012 with the film Diaz – Don't Clean Up This Blood by Daniele Vicari as a lawyer named Franci. In 2014 she took part in Nanni Moretti's film Mia Madre covering the role of the protagonist as a young woman in a flash back, a role played by Margherita Buy in the rest of the film.

In 2017 she joined the cast of the TV series 1993, covering the role of Eva.

Filmography

Film
Diaz – Don't Clean Up This Blood, directed by Daniele Vicari (2012)
Mia Madre, directed by Nanni Moretti (2014)
Amori che non sanno stare al mondo, directed by Francesca Comencini (2017)
Il campione, directed by Leonardo D'Agostini (2019)
Easy Living - La vita facile, directed by Orso Miyakawa (2019)
 Last Night of Amore, (Andrea Di Stefano, 2023)

Television
Don Matteo, directed by Giulio Base - TV series (2009)
Fuoriclasse, directed by Riccardo Donna - TV series (2011)
RIS Roma – Delitti imperfetti, directed by Francesco Miccichè - TV series (2011)
Benvenuti a tavola - Nord vs Sud, directed by Francesco Miccichè - TV series (2012)
Camera Café, Episode "Andrea Poeta" (2012)
Altri tempi, directed by Marco Turco - TV series (2013)
Una grande famiglia, directed by Ivan Silvestrini - TV series (2013)
L'assalto, directed by Ricky Tognazzi - TV series (2014)
Le mani dentro la città, directed by Alessandro Angelini - TV series (2014)
Thou Shalt Not Kill, directed by Giuseppe Gagliardi - TV series (2015)
1993, directed by Giuseppe Gagliardi - TV series (2017)
È arrivata la felicità, directed by Stefano Bises - TV series (2018)
Mentre ero via, directed by Ivan Cotroneo - TV series (2019)
Masantonio - Sezione scomparsi, directed by Fabio Mollo - TV series (2021)

References

External links

1986 births
Living people
Italian film actresses
Actresses from Naples
Italian stage actresses
Italian television actresses
People from Naples
21st-century Italian actresses